is a 1965 Japanese crime film directed by Yoji Yamada. It is based on Seichō Matsumoto's novel of the same title.

Plot
A robbery murder of an old moneylender woman occurs in the countryside of Kyushu, and Kiriko Yanagida's older brother, Masao, is arrested as a suspect and brought to justice. Masao is the first discoverer, who borrows money from the victim, and although the situation is overwhelmingly disadvantageous to him, he still pleads not guilty to murder. Kiriko goes to Tokyo and asks Kinzo Otsuka, a well-known attorney from her hometown, to defend her brother, but he refuses.

Cast
 Chieko Baisho　as Kiriko Yanagida
 Osamu Takizawa as Kinzo Otsuka
 Michiyo Aratama as Keiko Kawano
 Etsuko Ichihara as Nobuko
 Yūsuke Kawazu as Kenichi Sugita
Yosuke Kondo as Koichi Abe
 Taketoshi Naito as Shimada
 Nobuo Kaneko as Kawazu
 Shigeru Tsuyuguchi as Masao Yanagida
 Hisashi Igawa as Fisherman

References

External links

1965 films
Japanese crime drama films
Films directed by Yoji Yamada
1960s Japanese-language films
1960s Japanese films